The 2018 Women's African Volleyball Clubs Championship was the 29th edition of the tournament organized by the African Volleyball Confederation (CAVB). It took place between 4 and 15 of March and was held in Cairo, Egypt.

CF de Carthage started the competition as defending champions and reached the finals, where they were defeated 3–0 by Al Ahly SC. It was the ninth time Al Ahly won the Women's African Volleyball Clubs Championship title.

Teams
The following 19 teams competed in the tournament:

  Al Ahly SC
  ASEC Mimosas
  AS Douanes
  BDF 6
  Bafia VB
  CF de Carthage
  DGSP
  FAP
  Harare City
  INJS
  Kenya Pipeline
  Nigeria Customs
  Nyong et Kelle
  Nedjmet Riadhi Chlef
  Nkumba
  Kenya Prisons
  Revenue
  El Shams
  Vision

Group stage
Group winners and runners-up advance to the quarterfinals, groups thirds and fourths advance to the 8th–16th quarterfinals and groups fifth placed teams advance to the 17th–19th play-offs.

Pool A

|}

|}

Pool B

|}

|}

Pool C

|}

|}

Pool D

|}

|}

Knockout stage

17th to 19th place

17th–19th play-off

|}

17th place match

|}

9th to 16th place

9th–16th quarter-finals

|}

13th–16th semi-finals

|}

9th–12th semi-finals

|}

15th place match

|}

13th place match

|}

11th place match

|}

9th place match

|}

1st to 8th place

Quarterfinals

|}

5th–8th semifinals

|}

7th place match

|}

5th place match

|}

Semifinals

|}

3rd place match

|}

Final

|}

Final standing

Source: CAVB.

Awards
MVP:  Aya Elshamy (Al Ahly SC)
Best Blocker:  Trizah Atouka (Kenya Pipeline)
Best Libero:  Mariam Moustafa (Al Ahly SC)
Best Receiver:  Elizabeth Wanyama Nafula (Kenya Prisons)
Best Server:  Farida Elaskalany  (Al Ahly SC)
Best Setter:  Amina Mansour (CF de Carthage)
Best Spiker:  Khloud Genhani (CF de Carthage)
Source: CAVB.

References
 CAVB Knockout stage results.

External links
 Official website at CAVB
 Results at Scoresway.com

Women's volleyball in Egypt
International volleyball competitions hosted by Egypt
Sports competitions in Cairo
African Volleyball Championships
Africa